José Gil Solé (3 February 1929 – 10 September 2000) was a Spanish racing cyclist. He rode in the 1952 Tour de France.

References

External links
 

1929 births
2000 deaths
Spanish male cyclists
Place of birth missing
Sportspeople from the Province of Teruel
Cyclists from Aragon